Surendranagar Gate railway station  is a railway station serving in Surendranagar district of Gujarat state of India. It is under Bhavnagar railway division of Western Railway Zone of Indian Railways. Passenger, Express, and Superfast trains halt here.

Trains 

The following trains halt at Surendranagar Gate railway station in both directions:

 12971/72 Bandra Terminus–Bhavnagar Terminus Express
 22993/94 Bandra Terminus–Mahuva Superfast Express
 22989/90 Bandra Terminus–Mahuva Express
 17203/04 Bhavnagar Terminus–Kakinada Port Express
 19107/08 Bhavnagar Terminus–Udhampur Janmabhoomi Express
 19579/80 Bhavnagar Terminus–Delhi Sarai Rohilla Link Express

See also
Bhavnagar State Railway

References

Railway stations in Surendranagar district
Bhavnagar railway division